is a 1981 Japanese manga series written and illustrated by Atsuji Yamamoto. A 1988 OVA directed by Toyoo Ashida was produced by J.C.Staff. It was released on February 6, 1988, and was released in English by Manga Entertainment and Central Park Media.

Plot
Emperor High School seems to not care anymore about education, letting their students have free rein over nearly everything. The president even had to resort to teachers who came right out of a prison, because the students were so violent. One day, Ganpachi, a self declared teacher arrives, intending to bring order to this high school by introducing fear into the leader of all the gangs, Hinako. Having a hard time standing up against him, she still believes in the power of her lucky kitty gym pants.

As it turns out Ganpachi ran away from a genetic laboratory, which is probably why he has the tenacity and behavior of a cockroach.

Cast

Reception
On Anime News Network, Justin Sevakis said that "the animation is about TV quality for the era, meaning flat colors and virtually no detail, but a full range of motion that handles the speed required for such rapid-fire comedy."

References

External links

1988 anime films
1988 anime OVAs
1988 direct-to-video films
Direct-to-video animated films
Films directed by Toyoo Ashida
J.C.Staff
Japanese direct-to-video films
Teaching anime and manga